Belfast Shankill was a constituency of the Parliament of Northern Ireland.

Boundaries
Belfast Shankill was a borough constituency comprising part of northern Belfast. It was created in 1929 when the House of Commons (Method of Voting and Redistribution of Seats) Act (Northern Ireland) 1929 introduced first-past-the-post elections throughout Northern Ireland.

Belfast Shankill was created by the division of Belfast North into four new constituencies.  It survived unchanged, returning one member of Parliament, until the Parliament of Northern Ireland was temporarily suspended in 1972, and then formally abolished in 1973.

Politics
In common with other seats in North Belfast, the seat had little nationalist presence.  The seat was strongly Unionist, but there was some labour movement strength.  For the first twenty-four years of its existence, the seat was held by an independent Unionist.

Members of Parliament

Election results

At the 1945 and 1949 general elections, Tommy Henderson was elected unopposed.

At the 1962 Northern Ireland general election, Desmond Boal was elected unopposed.

References

Shankill
Northern Ireland Parliament constituencies established in 1929
Northern Ireland Parliament constituencies disestablished in 1973